La Pandora is a short novella by the French poet and writer Gerard de Nerval.  In the style of Sylvie, it recounts Nerval's stay in Vienna in 1839-1840 and his infatuation with a theatre actress there.  It was a follow-up to the text of Les Amours de Vienne, previously published in Revue de Paris in 1841 and incorporated in Nerval's book Voyage en Orient in 1852.  Pandora was originally titled Suite des Amours de Vienne - La Pandora.

Begun in 1853, Nerval intended Pandora for inclusion in Les Filles du Feu, but it was not finished in time for the volume.  The first part was published by Alexandre Dumas in the journal Le Mousquetaire in October 1854, but its publication was interrupted by Nerval’s suicide.  Several attempts were made in the 20th century to produce a finished draft, the first published by Aristide Marie in 1921.

Works by Gérard de Nerval
Short stories published posthumously